Austin James Highley (born February 28, 1997), better known by the ring name Ace Austin, is an American professional wrestler. He is currently signed to Impact Wrestling, where he is a former three-time impact X Division Champion and current one-time impact World Tag Team Champion. He also makes appearances for New Japan Pro Wrestling, where he is a member of Bullet Club. He began his career in Combat Zone Wrestling after graduating from the "Wild Samoan Pro-Wrestling Training center" wrestling school and has also competed for various promotions throughout the United States and Mexico including Major League Wrestling, Tommy Dreamer's House of Hardcore, Florida-based World Xtreme Wrestling, and Mexico's Lucha Libre AAA Worldwide (AAA).

Professional wrestling career

Early career 
Austin began his career in Combat Zone Wrestling (CZW) after graduating from the "CZW Dojo" wrestling school. He spent his early years also wrestling for the Anoa'i family's World Xtreme Wrestling promotion.

Impact Wrestling

X Division Champion (2019–2020)
In early 2019, vignettes began airing to promote Ace Austin's debut in Impact Wrestling. On the March 8 episode of Impact!, Austin made his debut in Impact by defeating Jake Atlas. It was then revealed that Austin had signed with the company. Eventually over the next couple of weeks, Austin would remain undefeated against Damian Hyde and Aiden Prince before making his pay-per-view debut at the United We Stand event, where he participated in an Ultimate X match to determine the #1 contender for the X Division Championship. Johnny Impact won the match. Austin continued his winning streak by defeating Aiden Prince, Eddie Edwards, Jake Crist, Jake Deaner and Petey Williams in a six-way match at Rebellion. Austin would then engage in a brief feud with Williams, which led to a match between the two on the May 3 episode of Impact!, which Austin won. Austin's winning streak ended on the June 21 episode of Impact!, when he lost to the returning TJP. Austin received title shots for the X Division Championship at Code Red and Unbreakable, but failed to win on both occasions.

Since the summer of 2019, Austin would enter into a feud with Eddie Edwards over his wife, Alisha. Austin defeated Edwards in a match on the October 11 episode of Impact! to qualify for a five-way ladder match for the X Division Championship at Bound for Glory, which he won by defeating Tessa Blanchard, Daga, Jake Crist and Acey Romero. Austin continued his feud with Edwards, losing to him in a street fight at Prelude to Glory but won a street fight rematch on the October 29 episode of Impact!. Their feud concluded with a tables match between the pair at No Surrender, which Edwards won. Austin continued to successfully defend the X Division Championship against former champion Jake Crist at Turning Point, Dez at Motown Showdown and Trey at Hard to Kill.

Austin began feuding with the Impact World Champion Tessa Blanchard in early 2020, stemming from the fact that Austin had beaten her in a ladder match to win the X Division Championship at Bound for Glory. The feud between the two led to a champion vs. champion match between the pair at Sacrifice, which Blanchard won. This win earned Blanchard a title shot against Austin for the X Division Championship on the February 25 episode of Impact!. Austin retained the title by getting disqualified after Taya Valkyrie attacked Blanchard. Austin lost the title to Willie Mack at Rebellion Night 1. He received a rematch for the title against Mack in a three-way match, also involving Chris Bey, on the May 5 episode of Impact!, where Mack retained the title.

Alliance with Madman Fulton (2020–2022)
After losing the X Division Championship, Austin participated in a tournament to determine the #1 contender for the Impact World Championship. He defeated Rhino, Hernandez and Wentz to win the tournament but didn't win the title. In 2020, he began an alliance with Madman Fulton to capture the Impact World Championship. At Slammiversary, he lost a five-way elimination match for the vacant title in a match that also involved Trey, Rich Swann, Eric Young and Eddie Edwards who was the eventual winner. At Bound for Glory, Austin and Fulton participated in a match for the Impact Tag Team Championship, but were defeated by The North. Austin was inactive for weeks since Impact didn't have plans for him, but he returned as part of the 2021 Super X Cup at Genesis. At the event, he defeated Suicide in the first round, Cousin Jake in the semifinals, and Blake Christian in the finals to win the tournament. At Hard to Kill, Austin issued an open-challenge, who was answered by Matt Cardona. Austin lost the match by disqualification. At No Surrender, Austin participated in the Triple Threat Revolver to determine the number one contender for the X Division Championship, but the match was won by Josh Alexander.

On the March 2 episode of Impact!, Austin defeated Black Taurus and Chris Bey to become the number one contender for the X Division Championship at Sacrifice. At the event, Austin defeated TJP and won the title for the second time of his career. He successfully retained his title against TJP on the March 23 episode of Impact!, losing by disqualification, but lost the title to Josh Alexander at Rebellion, in a match who also included TJP, ending his reign at 43 days. He failed to regain the title against Alexander on the April 29 episode of Impact!. At Under Siege, Austin and Fulton defeated Petey Williams and TJP, XXXL (Acey Romero and Larry D) and Rohit Raju and Shera to become the new number one contenders for the Impact World Tag Team Championship. On the May 20 Episode of Impact!, Austin and Fulton were defeated by FinJuice (David Finlay and Juice Robinson) and failed to win the titles. On July 17 at Slammiversary, Austin competed in an Ultimate X match for the X Division Championship, but failed to win the title. At Emergence, he defeated Chris Sabin, Moose, and Sami Callihan in a four-way match to become the number one contender to the Impact World Championship. On September 18 at Victory Road, he faced Christian Cage for the title in a losing effort. At Bound for Glory, Austin participated in the Call Your Shot Gauntlet match, which was won by Moose. Austin then started to feud against Chris Sabin, leading to a match at Turning Point, which Austin lost.

On January 8, 2022, at the Countdown to Hard To Kill pre-show, Austin was pinned by the debuting Mike Bailey in a four-way match. During the following weeks, Austin tried to befriend Bailey, eventually teaming with him on several occasions before Bailey turned on Austin after he asked him to attack X Division champion Trey Miguel. At Rebellion, Austin defeated Bailey and Miguel in a three-way match, winning the X Division Championship for the third time of his career. Austin successfully retained his title against Rocky Romero on the May 5 episode of Impact! and against former champion Miguel at Under Siege. On June 19 at Slammiversary, Austin lost the title to Bailey in an Ultimate X match, ending his reign at 57 days.

Bullet Club (2022–present)
On the March 2 2023 episode of Impact, Austin along with Chris Bey defeated The Motor City Machine Guns to win the Impact World Tag Team Championship for the first time in his career.

New Japan Pro-Wrestling
On May 1, Austin was announced to compete in the 29th annual Best of the Super Juniors event held by New Japan Pro Wrestling, he competed in the A-Block and finished with a record of 5 wins and 4 losses, resulting in a total of 10 points, failing to advance to the finals. On the final day, Austin, Alex Zayne, El Lindaman and Wheeler Yuta defeated Robbie Eagles, Yoh, Clark Connors and Titán. Later, in the night Austin interrupted a tag team match, helping Bad Luck Fale, Chase Owens and El Phantasmo defeat the United Empire's, Jeff Cobb, Great-O-Khan and Aaron Henare and celebrated with them post-match, therefore joining the Bullet Club.

Personal life 
Austin is an avid skateboarder and trains in parkour.

Championships and accomplishments
AAW Wrestling
AAW Heritage Championship (2 times)
AAW Tag Team Championship (1 time) – with Madman Fulton
Combat Zone Wrestling
CZW Wired Championship (1 time)
Desastre Total Ultraviolento
 DTU Alto Impacto Championship (1 time, current)
Impact Wrestling
Impact World Tag Team Championship (1 time) - with Chris Bey
Impact X Division Championship (3 times)
Super X Cup (2021)
Impact World Championship #1 Contender's Tournament (2020)
Impact Year End Awards (2 times)
X Division Star of the Year (2020)
Match of the Year (2020) 
 Pro Wrestling Illustrated
 Ranked No. 33 of the top 500 singles wrestlers in the PWI 500 in 2022
The Wrestling Revolver
PWR Remix Championship (1 time)
PWR Scramble Championship (1 time)
PWR Tag Team Championship (1 time, current) - with Chris Bey
World Xtreme Wrestling
WXW Ultimate Hybrid Championship (1 time)

References

External links

 
 
 

Living people
1997 births
American male professional wrestlers
Sportspeople from New Jersey
21st-century professional wrestlers
TNA/Impact X Division Champions
CZW Wired Champions
AAW Heritage Champions
AAW Tag Team Champions
Bullet Club members
TNA/Impact World Tag Team Champions